Hard to Find may refer to:
"Hard to Find", a song by The American Analog Set from their 2003 album Promise of Love
"Hard to Find", a song by Codeine from the EP Barely Real
"Hard to Find", a song by The National from their album Trouble Will Find Me
"Hard to Find", a song by Skillet from their 2013 album Rise